John Clarke (19 October 1934 – 22 May 2022) was a Canadian sailor. He competed in the Finn event at the 1972 Summer Olympics.

References

External links
 

1934 births
2022 deaths
Canadian male sailors (sport)
Olympic sailors of Canada
Sailors at the 1972 Summer Olympics – Finn
People from Hove